The Ozerki line was the first line constructed by the Primorskaya Railway in Saint Petersburg, Russia. It was opened on July 23, 1893, and closed in 1929.

Route
 Primorsky, 0 km
 Skachki, 2.0 km
 Kolomuagi 3.0 km
 Grafskiy Pavilion 5.0 km
 Ozyornaya, 6.2 km

References 

Railway lines in Russia
Railway lines opened in 1893
Railway lines closed in 1929
Former railway lines in Russia
1520 mm gauge railways in Russia